Saint-Cyr-l'École is a commune in the western suburbs of Paris, France.

It used to host the training school for officers of the French army, the École spéciale militaire de Saint-Cyr (ESM), which was relocated to Coëtquidan in 1945.
The old buildings of the ESM are now used by the lycée militaire de Saint-Cyr (military high school of Saint-Cyr).

Inhabitants are called Saint-Cyriens (uppercase, with students or graduates from the school called saint-cyriens with lowercase).

Geography
Saint-Cyr lies in the arrondissement of Versailles, west of the Park of Versailles. It is named after St. Cyricus.

Saint-Cyr-l'École is served by Saint-Cyr station, which is an interchange station on Paris RER line C, on the Transilien Line U suburban rail line, and on the Transilien Line N suburban rail line.

Saint-Cyr-l'Ecole airfield is long established and lies on the edge of the commune. It is used by light aircraft flown by private pilot owners and by members of aero clubs.  It is operated for public use by Aéroports de Paris.

History
King Louis XIV of France, at the request of Madame de Maintenon, founded Maison royale de Saint-Louis, an institute for poor young ladies.  It later became a military hospital. Napoleon founded the military academy for infantry and cavalry officers in 1808.

The tomb of Madame de Maintenon lies in the Chapel.

Population

Education
Schools in the city include:

Preschools:
 Robert Desnos
 Victor Hugo
 Léon Jouannet
 Paul Langevin
 Jean Macé
 Henri Wallon

Elementary schools:
 Ernest Bizet
 Jean Jaurès
 Irène Joliot-Curie
 Romain Rolland

There is one junior high school, Collège Jean Racine.

Senior high schools/sixth form colleges:
 Lycée Mansart
 Lycée professionnel Jean Perrin
 Lycée militaire de Saint-Cyr

Bibliothèque Albert Camus, which opened on 14 November 2013, is the community library.

Parks and recreation
The Centre aquatique de St-Cyr has the swimming facilities in the town.

Twin towns — sister cities 
  Butzbach, Germany – since 2008
  Bonnyrigg & Lasswade, Midlothian, Scotland

Personalities
Armand Laroche, painter

See also
Communes of the Yvelines department

References

External links

 Saint-Cyr-l'École 

Communes of Yvelines